The Volkswagen Polo Mk3 (Typ 6N/6KV) is the third generation of the Volkswagen Polo supermini car and was produced from 1994 until 2002, with a facelift at the end of 1999. It was available in hatchback, sedan and wagon body styles. Although the Polo Mk3 hatchback didn't share the same platform as the Seat Ibiza, saloon and estate models were rebadged as Seat Córdoba.

The hatchback underwent a major facelift for the model year 2000, while the saloon and the estate received only minor refinements. It now had a more different exterior and interior design than the also facelifted Seat Ibiza. At end 2001, it was discontinued and replaced by its successor, the Volkswagen Polo Mk4, but it continued production in Argentina, where the saloon was facelifted in 2004, receiving the exterior design applied to the facelifted Seat Córdoba and the interior of the facelifted Volkswagen Polo.

Overview

The MK3 Polo was unveiled on 31 August 1994, and was immediately available in left-hand drive form for continental markets, and was launched on the right-hand drive UK market in October that year. It was the first completely new Polo to be launched since the MK2 model in 1981; although that model had undergone a major restyle in 1990. It was also the first version of the Polo to be available with five doors as well as three doors. The initial range consisted of new 1.0 and 1.6 petrol engines; the 1.3 unit was carried over from the previous Polo but discontinued a year later in favour a new 1.4 unit, which became available around the same time as a 1.9 diesel and turbo-diesel models. The availability of a diesel Polo for the first time on the UK market brought it into line with almost all of its competitors, while the Polo was the last mainstream supermini in Europe to become available with five doors - five years after the Ford Fiesta was first available with five doors, and between seven and 11 years after the launch of five-door superminis including the Opel Corsa, Fiat Uno, Nissan Micra and Peugeot 205.
 
The platform used for this model was all new, although it shared some components with SEAT Ibiza Mk2 which had been launched a year earlier. Although the dashboard and a number of mechanical components, including some engines and rear suspension, were shared with the Ibiza, outwardly the Polo models were entirely different with no body panels shared with the SEAT model.

Initially, only three- and five-door hatchback versions were available. In 1995, four-door saloon ("Polo Classic/Sedan/Derby/Flight") and five-door estate ("Polo Wagon/Variant") versions were added to the range — these were badge engineered and mildly restyled versions of the SEAT Córdoba (the saloon and estate versions of the Ibiza). They were referred to internally by VW as the Typ 6KV, and shared body panels with the SEAT model rather than the hatchback models. A two-door coupe version of the Cordoba (the SX) was also produced, but the Polo was never made in this form.

A convertible version was not produced, although a version with an electrically sliding full length sunroof, called the Polo Open Air, was available.

Engines
Initially the car was available with the 1043cc putting out , and the 1272cc putting out  engines from the previous generation Polo, along with a new 1598cc unit. A new 1.4L engine replaced the 1.3L in October 1995. In September 1996 the 1043cc engine was replaced by an all-new aluminium block multi-point injection 999cc developing . For the first time, a turbo-diesel engine (1.9L) was available in a Polo, although only in the 6K models. Due to its smaller engine bay, the standard 3 and 5-door 6N did not get a turbo-diesel engine until the facelift in 2000.

The car was available with the following engines:

 1,043 cc straight-4 petrol  (1995–96)
 1,272 cc straight-4 petrol  (1995–96)
 1.6 L straight-4 petrol  (Engine Code – AEE)
 1.4 L straight-4 16-valve petrol  (Engine Code – AFH) stock but tuned 1.4 16v 75 Ps version
 1.4 L straight-4 16-valve petrol 
 1.4 L straight-4 petrol  (Engine Code AUD)(1996–)
 999 cc straight-4 petrol  — all-new aluminium block multi-point injection (1996–)
 1.6 L straight-4 16-valve petrol  (LHD European GTI model only)
 1.6 L straight-4 petrol  (6K saloon and estate models only) Engine code AFX. 
 1.6 L straight-4 petrol  (6K saloon and estate models only)
 1.8 L straight-4 petrol  (6K saloon and hatchback models only) Engine code AFV. 
 1.9 L straight-4 diesel

Trim levels
The Polo Mark 3 was much better equipped than its predecessor.  A range of models featured items such as colour-coded bumpers, heated/electrically adjustable mirrors, four speaker stereo, pollen filters, central locking, rear head restraints, split rear seats, fog lights, alloy wheels, and airbags.  The car was available originally in four trim levels ranging from the L at the bottom level of the scale through the CL and GL to the range topping GLX model. The range-topping was the Polo SE or Special Equipment; it featured a number of features from higher spec models such as the GLX bumpers, Sport Rader alloy wheels, tinted rear light clusters and clear indicators.

Unlike the Volkswagen Polo Mk1 and Volkswagen Polo Mk2, trim levels were not the same across Europe; the United Kingdom's were L, CL, GL, GLX, 16v (later E, S, SE and GTi); models sold in Europe had trim levels which were individual to the country they were marketed in. The facelift at the end of 1999 saw the introduction of E, S and SE trim levels, as well as the 1.6 GTI which was the first to be sold in Britain.

An all-new Polo was unveiled at the end of 2001, although the saloon and estate models continued in production until 2003, and were not replaced with any new additions to the newer Polo range.

Variants

Sporting variants

Sporting variants were not introduced initially, and a supercharged G40 version of the Mark 3 was never made, but a GTI model introduced in 1998 catered for the hot hatch market. With a limited production run of 3000 units, the 6N GTI was available only in continental Europe. The 16V, introduced to replace the GLX, was one of the most popular Mark 3 versions with modifiers, it used a 1.4 16V unit pushed to 100 PS (74 kW) as standard. This car was not a pure sporting model, and with a 0–100 km/h time of 10.6 seconds and a 190 km/h (118 mph) top speed, it was not as fast as the sporting Ibiza model (which used a 2.0 L 16V engine). The Polo GTI was often seen as overpriced for the performance it delivered.

Polo GTI

Between 2000 and 2002 VW offered two sporting models, the 16V and GTI.  The 16V came with the 1.4 16V 100 PS (74 kW) engine and had options such as 15" Spa alloys and air conditioning.  However more interest was in the GTI.  Available only in hatchback form, the GTI was powered by a 1.6 16V 125 PS (92 kW) engine with variable valve timing, making it the most powerful Polo to come out the factory to date. External changes gave the car the looks to match its power.  Deeper front bumpers with honeycomb mesh inserts, side skirts, fog lights, a honeycomb mesh grill and 15" BBS split rims suited the car well.  There were also standard extras such as Climatronic fully automatic air conditioning, Xenon headlights (with a headlight washer system), a 6 disc CD autochanger, exclusive sports interior with leather steering wheel and gearstick, chrome inserts and driver aids such as ABS with EBD and an EDL (a system to aid traction).  Leather and satellite navigation were also optional extras.  The Mark 3F Polo GTI however missed the new six-speed gearbox that was introduced in the smaller Lupo GTI.

Polo Harlekin

In Europe, a limited edition "Harlekin" model was released in 1995. The Polo Harlekin featured multi-coloured body panels with a symmetrical combination of Flash Red, Ginster Yellow, Pistachio Green and Chagall Blue. Harlekin Polos used the 1.4l petrol engine and featured special "Joker" pattern seats and bespoke gear knob and steering wheel. Originally limited to 1,000, around 3,800 of this series were produced. 2,500 Polo Harlekins were sold in the UK between 1996 and 1998.

Facelift

The facelifted Mark III Phase II (or Typ 6N2; sometimes referred to as the Mark IIIF or "Mark 5" by enthusiasts) was released in 1999. The hatchback models featured updated styling including new headlights and bumpers and an all new interior based on that of the Lupo. Although the car was similar in appearance to the Mark 3 (the bodyshell was fully galvanised and stiffened but not fully redesigned, although some panels were changed), Volkswagen claimed that 70% of the components were new.  Power steering, antilock brakes and twin airbags were made standard.  The saloon and estate versions received the new interior, but not the full exterior facelift.  Also, the three-cylinder 1.4-litre TDI engine was introduced for the three and five-door hatchbacks.

Specification options ranged from power steering, tinted glass, split rear seats, electric windows and cup holders to ABS, air conditioning, Xenon headlights and satellite navigation.  Thirty-two models with seven engines ranging from the 1.4 diesel to the 1.6 L 16V GTI made the choice of Polo the widest ever seen.  The base model was the Comfortline with the option of no less than 5 engines ranging from the 1.0 50 PS (37 kW) to the 1.9 TDI unit found across the VW range, producing 90 PS (66 kW).  The 1.0 L hatchback was considered cheap for the build quality and spec list when compared to other cars.  Then came the Trendline and Highline models. With engine options ranging from 60 PS (44 kW) to a 110 PS (81 kW) diesel they offered a range of features usually found on the more sporty models but without the insurance or running cost woes.

Volkswagen also introduced a GTI version of this facelift, this time also available outside of Germany. The GTI is equipped with a further developed 1.6l 16v engine from the 6N with 92 kW (125 hp), this time with VVT (Variable Valve Timing) which activates from 5,000 revs, making the engine sound more exuberant. The GTI is recognizable by original Xenon lighting with headlight washers (the only one in the 6N2 range), honeycomb grills, 10mm factory lowered suspension, a thicker front lip and original 15" BBS rims with 195mm wide tires.

Both versions of the Mark III Polo were strong sellers in the United Kingdom and strong competitor for the likes of the Fiat Punto and Nissan Micra. At the time of its launch, it was arguably the best small car on sale in Europe in terms of build quality and "upmarket" feel, although its ride and handling was generally not considered to be as good as that of the Ford Fiesta or Peugeot 206. The 1.4 TDI was considered the best in the range due to its reliability, fuel consumption, and relative power, for a small engine.

Awards
1999 Used Car Buyer Greatest Used Car Buy Awards – Best Economy Car
1998 Top Gear Magazine Top Cars – Best Supermini
1997 Which? Magazine Best Buys – Best Supermini
1997 Auto Express New Car Honours – Best Supermini
1997 Complete Car of the Year Awards – Best Supermini
1996 Semperit Irish Car of the Year
1995 What Car? – Car of the Year

Outside Europe

Asia
In some Asia Pacific markets, the Polo Classic (1995-2002MY) was sold as the Derby.

In China, FAW-Volkswagen simply rebadged the SEAT Cordoba without the exterior modifications of the European Derby (i.e. rear and front bumpers/headlights).
It was sold & assembled as the FAW-VW City-Golf during 1996. This version was also sold in Russia as the Volkswagen Polo Classic S. 
It is not to be confused with the Canadian Mark 4 City Golf  released in 2006 in Canada.
The Polo Classic similar to the Chinese market version was also sold in the Philippines from 1996 to 1999.

Latin America

In Argentina, Volkswagen produced the Polo Classic, which was sold as the Derby in Mexico, and the Volkswagen Caddy, a SEAT Inca-derived van, which shares the same platform and front end styling as the Polo Classic. The Polo Classic (Typ 6K) and the Caddy (Typ 9K) have been produced since 2000. All the facelifted models are Argentine-built models.

Latin America had its own trim levels, although some of the trim level names were similar to their European counterparts. The CL and GL were available from 1996 onwards in Brazil; these were similar to their European counterparts, although slightly more expensive due to import tariffs.

Related models
The SEAT Ibiza Mark 2 was based on the same platform as the Mk3 Polo Classic and Variant, as were the SEAT Inca and Volkswagen Caddy panel vans.
The South African built Volkswagen Polo Playa was a rebadged version of the SEAT Ibiza Mark 2, and was sold instead of the European Polo in South Africa until the introduction of the Polo Mark 4.
The Volkswagen Lupo and SEAT Arosa city cars were based on a shortened version of the 6N platform, and shared many components.

See also 

 Volkswagen Polo for an overview of all models
 Volkswagen Polo Mk1
Volkswagen Polo Mk2
 Volkswagen Polo Mk4
 Volkswagen Polo Mk5
 Volkswagen Polo Mk6

References

External links

 Volkswagen UK's Polo Site
 Volkswagen Australia's Polo Site
 Polo3 - Mk1 Mk2 & Mk3 Polo owners community UK
 Club Polo UK Website (source for some of the model history information)
 uk-polos.net, THE UK Polo Forum (UK based VW Polo Forum)
 POLO Club Russia

Polo 3
Subcompact cars
Front-wheel-drive vehicles
Hatchbacks
Sedans
Station wagons
Cars introduced in 1994
2000s cars